"Black Hearts (On Fire)" is a song by Australian rock band Jet and is the second single taken from their third album Shaka Rock. Like She's a Genius which was the first single from the album, the song debuted at a secret show in Melbourne in November 2008 and was later included as a track on the album. The single was released on iTunes on 2 November.

Track listing

Chart positions

In popular culture
The song was featured in an episode of the first season of the TV show The Vampire Diaries.

The song was also featured in the Australian film 'Tomorrow, When The War Began'

References

2009 singles
Jet (band) songs
Songs written by Chris Cester
Songs written by Cameron Muncey
2009 songs
Warner Music Australasia singles
Atlantic Records singles